is a subway station on the Toei Shinjuku Line in Chūō, Tokyo, Japan, operated by Toei Subway.

Lines

Station layout
The station is connected by underground passages with Higashi-nihombashi Station on the Toei Asakusa Line and Bakurochō Station on the JR Sōbu Main Line.

Platforms
Bakuro-yokoyama Station consists of two side platforms.

History
Bakuroyokoyama Station opened on 21 December 1978.

References

Railway stations in Japan opened in 1978
Railway stations in Tokyo
Nihonbashi, Tokyo